The Child Protection and Obscenity Enforcement Act of 1988, title VII, subtitle N of the Anti-Drug Abuse Act of 1988, is part of a United States Act of Congress which places stringent record-keeping requirements on the producers of actual, sexually explicit materials. The guidelines for enforcing these laws (colloquially known as 2257 regulations) (C.F.R. Part 75), part of the United States Code of Federal Regulations, require producers of sexually explicit material to obtain proof of age for every model they shoot, and retain those records. Federal inspectors may at any time launch inspections of these records and prosecute any infraction.

While the statute seemingly excluded from these record-keeping requirements anyone who is involved in activity that "does not involve hiring, contracting for, managing, or otherwise arranging for, the participation of the performers depicted," the Department of Justice (DOJ) defined an entirely new class of producers known as "secondary producers." According to the DOJ, a secondary producer is anyone who "publishes, reproduces, or reissues" explicit material.

On October 23, 2007, the 6th Circuit U.S. Court of Appeals ruled that the record keeping requirements were facially invalid because they imposed an overbroad burden on legitimate, constitutionally protected speech.  However the U.S. DOJ, under control by U.S. Attorney General Michael B. Mukasey, has asked for, and was granted, an en banc review of the initial decision of the 6th Circuit Court in order to see if the initial decision should be overturned. The Sixth Circuit subsequently reheard the case en banc and issued an opinion on February 20, 2009, upholding the constitutionality of the record-keeping requirements, albeit with some dissents.

The United States Supreme Court refused to hear (denied certiorari to) the April 2009 challenge to Connection Distributing Co. v. Holder, the Sixth Circuit Court of Appeals decision on the legality of 2257 and its enforcement. (See "Order List", Monday, October 5, 2009).

Allied administrative law (2257 regulations) 
The administrative law that has been created by virtue of the Act to guide and aid its enforcement, 28 C.F.R. 75 (also known as the 2257 regulations), specifies record-keeping requirements for those wishing to produce sexually explicit media, and imposes criminal penalties for failure to comply. This is intended to ensure that no person under the legal age is involved in such undertakings. (See  and Child pornography laws in the United States for more information about the term "sexually explicit".)

The regulations define the terms "primary producer" and "secondary producer". The term "produces" means:

A "primary producer" is defined in the set of rules as 

A "secondary producer" is 

One may be both a primary and a secondary producer.

"Manage content" means 

"Computer site or service" means 

The regulations also spell out requirements for the maintenance, categorization, location, and inspection of records, as well as legal grounds for exemption of these requirements. They require that records be maintained for five years after the dissolution of a business that had been required to maintain them.

The Department of Justice can modify the regulations, based on the discretion, or possible future requirements, that has been given to it to do so by the Act.

Enforcement
It is clear there is much sexual material on the Internet and elsewhere that would fall within the terms of this law. At present, the U.S. Department of Justice has only implemented one specific case based primarily on the new 2257 laws and its supportive regulations. The case was against Mantra Films, Inc., based in Santa Monica, California, and its sister company MRA Holdings (both owned by Joe Francis), who are the originators of the Girls Gone Wild video series. Francis and several of his managers were prosecuted, citing infractions of this act.
In January 2007, these charges were for the most part dropped.

However, Francis and the company entered guilty pleas on three counts of failing to keep the required records and seven labeling violations for its series of DVDs and videos before U.S. District Judge Richard Smoak, agreeing to pay $2.1 million in fines and restitution. This allowed Francis to avoid possible harsher penalties which include five years prison time for each violation.

Also in 2006, the FBI, under the direction of United States attorney general John Ashcroft, began checking the 2257 records of several pornography production companies.

The final regulations implementing Congressional amendments to 2257, termed 2257A, were updated December 18, 2008 and went into effect on the same day as the inauguration of Barack Obama. On that same day, January 20, 2009, President Obama, through Chief of Staff Rahm Emanuel, requested by memorandum that heads of departments allow for review by the incoming administration of all regulations not then final.

Legal challenges
The initial iteration of 2257, first passed in 1988, mandated that producers keep records of the age and identity of performers and affix statements as to the location of the records to depictions. However, rather than penalties for noncompliance, the statute created a rebuttable presumption that the performer was a minor. Pub. L. 100-690. This version was struck down as unconstitutional in American Library Association v. Thornburgh on First Amendment grounds.  713 F. Supp. 469 (D.D.C. 1989) vacated as moot 956 F.2d 1178 (D.C. Cir. 1992).

After Thornburgh, Congress amended 2257 to impose direct criminal penalties for noncompliance with the record-keeping requirements. The same plaintiffs challenged the amended statute and accompanying regulations, but the new version was upheld by American Library Association v. Reno, 33 F.3d 78 (D.C. Cir. 1994).

In Sundance Association Inc. v. Reno, 139 F.3d 804 (10th Cir. 1998), the Tenth Circuit rejected the regulation's distinction between primary and secondary producers and entirely exempted from the record-keeping requirements those who merely distribute or those whose activity "does not involve hiring, contracting for, managing, or otherwise arranging for the participation of the performers depicted." 18 U.S.C. § 2257(h)(3).

In 2004, bound by the new PROTECT Act of 2003, the DOJ made sweeping changes to the 2257 regulations to keep up with the proliferation of sexually explicit material found on the Internet. However, the "secondary producer" language not only remained in the regulations, but the DOJ created a much wider interpretation of who exactly was a "producer" of sexually explicit material and hence was required to comply with the new regulations. Anyone who touched explicit content in any way could arguably be considered a producer and be forced to maintain identification records of models along with a highly complex indexing system that many argue is impossible to implement. Under the current law, anyone who commercially operates a website or releases sexually explicit images of actual humans, regardless of the format (DVD, photos, books, etc.), is subject to penalties that include up to five years in federal prison per each infraction of the regulations. These regulations do not currently apply to explicit drawings (i.e., adult cartoons, hentai) as no actual humans are involved in such production. However, the exclusion for such sexually explicit drawings are being confronted with changes to these laws in the recently signed Adam Walsh Child Protection and Safety Act addendum to the adult record-keeping requirements now codified at 18 U.S.C. § 2257A.  At this time, though signed into law, the portions of § 2257A which include simulated sex are not enforceable.

In June 2005, the Free Speech Coalition (FSC) sued the Department of Justice to enjoin the regulations until they can be challenged in whole in court. In December 2006, a federal judge issued an injunction protecting secondary producers who are members of the Free Speech Coalition, but FBI inspections of these producers are still ongoing despite the injunction.

On March 30, 2007, District Court Judge Walker Miller issued an interim ruling, which dismissed some causes of action and allowed others from the initial 2005 case to proceed in light of the Walsh Act amendments. The actual trial phase has not yet begun.

On October 23, 2007, the 6th Circuit U.S. Court of Appeals ruled the federal record-keeping statute unconstitutional, holding that the law is overly broad and facially invalid.  The Sixth Circuit subsequently reheard the case en banc and issued an opinion on February 20, 2009, upholding the constitutionality of the record-keeping requirements, albeit with some dissents.

Proposed regulations
On July 12, 2007, the Department of Justice issued a preliminary set of addendum record keeping regulations based on the Walsh Act amendments onto the existing regulations at 25 C.F.R. pt. 75. These new regulations are meant to encompass the inclusion of simulated sexual actions that do not actually show explicit sexual contact or fulfillment that were included by the Adam Walsh Act that was signed into law in 2007.

These new regulations were allowed in actual legal enforcement by the dismissal of its constitutionality challenges by U.S. District Judge Michael Baylson on July 28, 2010, as the U.S. Supreme Court had already refused to hear the same challenge in 2009.

Court affirmation of 2257 and 2257A

After the July 2010 decision by U.S. District Judge Michael Baylson to dismiss the FSC's lawsuit per the request of U.S. Attorney General Eric Holder's DOJ, agreeing that USC 2257 and 2257A regulations are constitutional, the FSC then filed an additional appeal to amend their original challenge to the constitutionality challenge.

On Monday, September 20, 2010, Judge Baylson rejected FSC's amended appeal, allowing the government record-keeping inspections to be restarted.

2016 court ruling

The FSC appealed the case to the Court of Appeals for the Third Circuit. In 2016, the court ruled that the record-keeping regulations did not violate the First Amendment. However, they also ruled that requiring adult producers to make the records available without a warrant, accessible by law enforcement for any reason, violated a producer's Fourth Amendment protections against unreasonable search and seizure.

See also
 Internet Safety Act

References

External links
 
 Department of Justice Final Rule for 28 CFR Part 75: Effective January 20, 2009 | HTML / PDF
 Text of 28 C.F.R. pt. 75: amendments to the regulations became effective on June 23, 2005, via GPO Electronic Code of Federal Regulations

1988 in law
100th United States Congress
United States pornography law
United States federal criminal legislation
United States federal legislation
United States federal legislation articles without infoboxes